Lakenvallei Dam is a combined gravity & arch type dam located on Sanddrifskloof River, near Ceres, Western Cape, South Africa. It was established in 1974 it serves mainly for irrigation purposes. The hazard potential of the dam has been ranked high (3).

See also
List of reservoirs and dams in South Africa
List of rivers of South Africa

References 

 List of South African Dams from the Department of Water Affairs and Forestry (South Africa)

Dams completed in 1974
Dams in South Africa